Alec Marks (10 December 1910 – 28 July 1983) was an Australian cricketer. He played 35 first-class matches for New South Wales between 1928/29 and 1936/37.

See also
 List of New South Wales representative cricketers

References

External links
 

1910 births
1983 deaths
Australian cricketers
New South Wales cricketers
Cricketers from Brisbane